Ballykeel Dolmen is a neolithic tripod portal tomb and a State Care Historic Monument at the foot of the western flank of Slieve Gullion, above a tributary of the Forkhill river, in the Newry, Mourne and Down District Council area, at grid ref: H9950 2132.

The dolmen sits at the southern end of a large cairn, of approximately 30x10 metres, the north end of which also contains a cist. Its three metre long capstone, with a notable notch similar to that of Legananny Dolmen, had previously fallen, but was re-set during excavations in 1963.

Excavations of the chamber revealed different types of pottery, including three highly decorated "Ballyalton" bowls, and the cist contained several hundred sherds of Neolithic pottery, a javelin head, and three flint flakes.

References

Archaeological sites in County Armagh
Dolmens in Northern Ireland